The National Sports Tribunal was established by the National Sports Tribunal Act 2019 to hear and resolve sports-related disputes in Australia. It provides national sporting organisations (and other sporting bodies), athletes and athlete support personnel with "a cost-effective, efficient, and independent forum for resolving sports-related disputes, consistent, transparent and accountable services and a range of resolution methods: arbitration, mediation, conciliation or case appraisal".

The Tribunal was a recommendation of the Report of the Review of Australia's Sports Integrity Arrangements (the Wood review). Previously appeals from the Australian Sports Anti-Doping Authority (ASADA) had been heard by the Administrative Appeals Tribunal. As part of the same package of reforms ASADA was replaced by a new body, Sport Integrity Australia.

John Boultbee was appointed the inaugural Chief Executive Officer on 2 March 2020. The Tribunal began operations on 19 March 2020. The National Sports Tribunal will initially be established as a two-year trial to develop capability against demand, and refine operations and services.

See also

Sports in Australia

References

External links
 National Sports Tribunal Bill 2019
  National Sports Tribunal Bill 2019 Explanatory Memorandum

Sports governing bodies in Australia
2020 establishments in Australia
Government agencies established in 2020
Sports law
Australian tribunals